Ahmed Zabana (real name: Ahmed Zahana, born 1926, died June 19, 1956) was an Algerian militant who participated in the outbreak of the Algerian War. He was executed by guillotine on June 19, 1956, in Algiers.

Early life
Zabana was born in 1926 in Saint-Lucien (now Zahana). The youngest of nine children, he was a member of the Algerian Muslim Scouts, which inspired nationalist feeling in him. He joined the Movement for the Triumph of Democratic Liberties in 1950. He later became a member of the military wing of a pro-independence secret society, and participated in a mail operation in Oran in 1950. He was later arrested and spent three years in prison and an additional three years in exile.

Role in the preparation of the revolution
After the dissolution of the Revolutionary Committee of Unity and Action on 5 July 1954, Zabana was commissioned by Larbi Ben M'hidi to prepare for the revolution by obtaining weapons and personnel.  Zabana's tasks were to structure revolutionary forces and train them, and also to visit strategic locations to choose places that could be made centers of revolution. Zabana succeeded in forming revolutionary cadres in Zahana, Oran, Aïn Témouchent, Hammam Bou Hadjar, Hassi El Ghella, and Chaabet El Ham.  he then ordered the men of the cadres to gather subscriptions for buying weapons and ammunition. With Abdulmalek Ramadan, Zabana supervised the military training of the cadres.  At a meeting on October 30, 1954, chaired by Ben M'hidi, the organizers of the revolution determined that it would begin with a series of attacks on the night of November 1. The following day, October 31st, Zabana met with his units and assigned specific targets as well as a rendezvous point on Jabal al-Qada.

Role in the revolution
On November 1, 1954, Zabana led a successful operation in Lamarda. After carrying out the offensive operations against the agreed French objectives, Zabana met with the leaders and members of the operational teams to assess them and plan what should be done in the coming stages.  Zabana was captured in the Battle of Gar Bouklida on November 11, 1954, in which he was wounded.  He was taken to a hospital and then to prison.

Execution
On April 21, 1955, Zabana was brought to the military court in Oran and sentenced to death. On May 3, 1955, he was transferred to the Serkadji Prison in Algiers. He was executed on 19 June 1956.

Legacy
The Ahmed Zabana National Museum and Ahmed Zabana Stadium in Oran are named after him.  In 2012, the Algerian film director Saïd Ould-Khelifa launched a biographical film Zabana! with the lead role of Zabana played by Imad Benchenni.

References

External links
 Commemoration of Ahmed Zabana (55 years ago) - algerie-plus.com

1926 births
1956 deaths
Algerian torture victims
Members of the National Liberation Front (Algeria)
People executed by France by guillotine
People of the Algerian War
People from Mascara Province
Executed Algerian people
People executed by the French Fourth Republic